Ammar Ali Abdulla Jumaa Al-Jeneibi (born 1982) is an Emirati professional football referee. He has been a full international for FIFA since 2011. He refereed some matches in AFC Champions League.

AFC Asian Cup

References

External links 
 
 

1982 births
Living people
Emirati football referees
AFC Asian Cup referees